Obesotoma tenuilirata is a species of sea snail, a marine gastropod mollusk in the family Mangeliidae.

Description
The length of the shell varies between 8 mm and 24 mm.

W.H. Dall considered this originally as perhaps a variety of Bela laevigata (synonym of synonym of Obesotoma laevigata (Dall, 1871)). It is pure white, with distinct revolving lines decussated by regular lines of growth. Only one specimen of this description was found, which is even more globular than the typical form, and has a deeper sinus and narrower aperture. It may be distinct.

Distribution
This marine species occurs in the Sea of Japan, the Bering Sea and off Alaska (Point Barrow, Arctic Ocean, to the Shumagin Islands).

References

 Dall (1919) Descriptions of new species of Mollusca from the North Pacific Ocean; Proceedings of the U.S. National Museum, vol. 56 (1920)

External links
  Tucker, J.K. 2004 Catalog of recent and fossil turrids (Mollusca: Gastropoda). Zootaxa 682:1–1295.

tenuilirata
Gastropods described in 1871